Medinipur Baptist Church is a Baptist church  situated at Sepahi Bazar, Medinipur town in Paschim Medinipur district of West Bengal.

History

American Baptist Free Mission Society came to Medinipur region in 19th century for missionary works. American missionary Rev. Otis Robinson Bacheler and his second wife Sarah P. Merrill, established the church at Medinipur in 1862. Initially this church was known as American Baptist Church. It is the first church founded by any American Baptist in the area.

References

External links
 

Churches in West Bengal
1862 establishments in British India
Churches completed in 1862
Tourist attractions in Paschim Medinipur district
Baptist churches in India